James T. Kennaway (25 January 1907 – 7 March 1969), commonly known as Joe Kennaway, was a dual international (Canada and Scotland) football goalkeeper. He began his career in Canada, spent four years in the American Soccer League before finishing his career with Celtic in the Scottish Football League. He later coached the Brown University soccer team from 1946 to 1959.

Professional career
Kennaway began his senior soccer career with amateur Montreal club Montreal CPR, the team of the Canadian Pacific Railway. In January 1927 he signed with Providence F.C. of the first professional American Soccer League. In 1928, the club was renamed the Providence Gold Bugs. In 1931, new ownership moved the team to Fall River, Massachusetts and renamed the team Fall River. In the summer of 1931, the team again changed ownership, becoming the New Bedford Whalers. Kennaway remained with the team through all these changes.

An excellent performance in a friendly game for Fall River against a touring Celtic team in 1931 gained the attention of the Scottish side. When their regular goalkeeper John Thomson died during a match later that year, Kennaway was signed by Celtic. Kennaway played from 1931 to 1939 in the Scottish Football League for Celtic. During his stint Celtic won the league championship twice and the Scottish Cup twice (1933 and 1937). He made 295 total appearances for the Bhoys and recorded 83 clean sheets.

National teams
Kennaway was a dual internationalist. He played once for Canada, against the United States in Brooklyn in 1926 on 6 November.

After joining Celtic, he played for Scotland against Austria at Hampden Park in 1933. He would have played more times for Scotland, but the other Home Nations objected to a Canadian playing in goal for Scotland. Kennaway also represented the Scottish League XI four times.

Some reports also state that Kennaway played for the United States, but there is no evidence of this. He did become a US citizen in 1948.

Post playing career
Kennaway returned to his native Canada upon the outbreak of the Second World War in 1939. His wife being from Providence, the couple settled there after the War. Kennaway went on to coach the soccer team of Brown University from 1946 to 1959, replacing Sam Fletcher.

In 2000, he was inducted into the Canadian Soccer Hall of Fame.

See also
 List of association footballers who have been capped for two senior national teams
 List of Scotland international footballers born outside Scotland

References

External links
 / Canada Soccer Hall of Fame
 Colin Jose: Joe Kennaway, Montreal's World Class Goalkeeper, Soccer Report Extra, 2010-10-12.

1905 births
1969 deaths
American soccer coaches
American Soccer League (1921–1933) players
Anglophone Quebec people
Brown Bears men's soccer coaches
Canadian emigrants to the United States
Canadian expatriate sportspeople in the United States
Canadian expatriate soccer players
Canada men's international soccer players
Canada Soccer Hall of Fame inductees
Canadian soccer players
Celtic F.C. players
Dual internationalists (football)
Expatriate soccer players in the United States
Fall River F.C. players
Association football goalkeepers
Montreal CPR players
New Bedford Whalers players
Soccer players from Montreal
Providence Clamdiggers players
Providence Gold Bug players
Canadian people of Scottish descent
Scotland international footballers
Scottish Football League players
Scottish footballers
Scottish Football League representative players
Canadian expatriate sportspeople in Scotland
Scottish expatriate sportspeople in the United States
Scottish expatriate footballers